Ramsey Mereside, known colloquially as "The Village", is a small village approximately  north of the town of Ramsey, Cambridgeshire . The Fenland Light Railway, a 7¼" gauge miniature railway is located in the village. The popular village hall holds many regular entertainment events.

References

External links 
 Mereside Village Hall Website

Villages in Cambridgeshire
Ramsey, Cambridgeshire